The Sint Eustatius Football League was a league competition held on Sint Eustatius from 1980 until 1984.

Known teams 
 Aswad
 Golden Eagles
 Golden Stars
 Peps Monks
 Raddics
 Statia Terminal
 Superstars

Champions 

1980 : not known
1981 : not known
1982 : not known
1983 : Golden Eagles
1984 : Golden Eagles

References 

Football competitions in Sint Eustatius
Top level football leagues in the Caribbean
Defunct top level association football leagues in North America
Sports leagues established in 1980
Sports leagues disestablished in 1984
1980 establishments in the Netherlands Antilles
1984 disestablishments in the Netherlands Antilles